The 12403 / 12404 Allahabad–Jaipur Express is a Express train belonging to Indian Railways that runs between  &  in India. It is a daily service serving the states of Uttar Pradesh & Rajasthan.

It operates as train number 12403 from Prayagraj Junction to Jaipur and as train number 12404 in the reverse direction.

Previously it used to run till  but now is extended till Jaipur.

It runs with an electric locomotive from Prayagraj to Agra Cantt then the loco reverses at Agra Cannt.
Its offlink loco is Ghaziabad WAP-7.

Coaches

It has 1 AC 1st Class cum AC 2 tier, 1 AC 2 tier, 2 AC 3 tier, 8 Sleeper class, 7 General class coaches with a total of 19 coaches. As with most train services in India, coach composition may be amended at the discretion of Indian Railways depending on demand.

Service

It is a daily train & covers the distance of 782 kilometres in 13 hours 20 mins as 12403 Allahabad–Jaipur Express (58.94 km/hr) & 13 hours 35 mins as 12404 Jaipur–Allahabad Express (57.07 km/hr).

Traction

The route is now fully electrified, it is hauled by a Ghaziabad-based WAP-7 (HOG)-equipped locomotive from end to end.

Routeing

Coach composition
The coach composition of the train is

 1 AC I Tier + II Tier (hybrid) 
 2 AC II Tier
 6 AC III Tier
 2 AC III Economy
 5 Sleeper coaches
 4 General
 2 Second-class Luggage/parcel van

Timing

12403 – Leaves Prayagraj Junction daily at night 11:10 PM and reaches Jaipur Junction next day at afternoon 12:10 PM IST
12404 – leaves Jaipur Junction every day at 3:20 PM IST and reaches Prayagraj Junction in early morning 4:45 AM IST

External links
Allahabad–Jaipur Express India Rail Info

Transport in Jaipur
Trains from Allahabad
Express trains in India
Rail transport in Rajasthan